Alixes Scott (born January 27, 1995) is a Guamanian beauty queen who was crowned Miss Guam 2013 and represented her country at the Miss Universe 2013 pageant.

Early life
Alixes Scott was born in Hawaii and moved to Tamuning, Guam when she was one. She is part Filipino and has mentioned visiting the Philippines in the past.

Miss Guam 2013
Alixes Scott was crowned Miss Universe Guam 2013 at the conclusion of the pageant held at the Hyatt Regency Guam in Tamuning on September 16, 2013. The 18-year-old beauty then represented Guam in the Miss Universe 2013 pageant on November 9, 2013 in Moscow, Russia, but failed to place.

Personal life
Alixes is a student at the University of Guam.

References

External links
Official Miss Guam website
Official Miss Guam Facebook

1988 births
Miss Universe 2013 contestants
Living people
Guamanian beauty pageant winners
Guamanian people of Filipino descent